João Pedro Rodrigues (born 24 August 1966) is a Portuguese film director. He is considered to be part of The School of Reis film family.

Career
Having studied at the School of Theatre and Cinema of Portugal, Rodrigues started his career as an assistant director and editor in several features, directed, for example, by Alberto Seixas Santos and Teresa Villaverde, among others. In 1997 Rodrigues directed his first film. O Fantasma (Phantom) (2000). Apart from the minor controversy it generated in Portugal, the film was shown in Spain, Italy, France, Brazil and the United States with modest results. Two Drifters (2005), his second feature film, has garnered relative international acclaim and was shown at the Cannes Film Festival.

His features have been produced and released by the production company Rosa Filmes.

Personal life
He is openly gay.

Filmography
 1988 - O Pastor
 1997 - Happy Birthday! (Parabéns!)
 1997 - Esta é a Minha Casa
 1998 - A Trip to the Expo (Viagem à Expo)
 2000 - O Fantasma
 2005 - Two Drifters (Odete)
 2007 - China China
 2009 - To Die Like a Man (Morrer Como Um Homem)
 2011 - Red Dawn (Alvorada Vermelha)
 2012 - Manhã de Santo António
 2012 - The Last Time I Saw Macao (A Última Vez Que Vi Macau)
 2012 - The King's Body (O Corpo de Afonso)
 2013 - Mahjong
 2016 - The Ornithologist (O Ornitólogo)
 2016 - Where Do You Stand Now, João Pedro Rodrigues? (Où en êtes-vous, João Pedro Rodrigues?)
 2022 - Will-o'-the-Wisp (Fogo-Fátuo)

References

External links
 
 João Pedro Rodrigues in Cinemascope

1966 births
Living people
People from Lisbon
Portuguese film directors
Radcliffe fellows
Portuguese screenwriters
Gay screenwriters
LGBT film directors
Portuguese gay writers
Portuguese LGBT screenwriters
Lisbon Theatre and Film School alumni